Mateus Lima Cruz (born 18 January 1993), known as Mateus, is a Brazilian footballer who plays as a forward for Nasaf.

Club career
Born in Iturama, Minas Gerais, Mateus Lima was a Grêmio Barueri youth graduate. After a short loan spell at Sport Barueri, he made his professional debut on 17 November 2012, starting in a 2–0 home win against Avaí for the Série B championship.

On 4 February 2013 Mateus Lima moved to Sport Recife. After only appearing for the club in the Campeonato Pernambucano, he joined Guarani on 10 December.

On 16 January 2014, Mateus Lima signed for Luverdense. He scored his first professional goal on 19 November, but in a 1–2 home loss against América Mineiro; he added another ten days later, netting the game's only in a home success over Ceará.

On 20 February 2015, Mateus Lima agreed to a contract with Operário Ferroviário. He was crowned champions of the year's Campeonato Paranaense, but appeared rarely.

In June 2015, Mateus Lima signed with Albanian Champions Skënderbeu Korçë as a reinforcement for the club's campaign in Champions League after the departures of Aco Stojkov, Dhiego Martins and Fatjon Sefa. The Brazilian striker was also a target of FK Kukësi. In his unofficial debut on 16 June, Lima scored in his debut after 29 minutes in an eventual 2–1 win against Romanian side. Despite scoring in his debut, however, he was not named in Skënderbeu's squad list for the first qualifying round of the UEFA Champions League because he did not convince his coach Mirel Josa in his appearances.

In July 2015, after just one month with Skënderbeu Korçë, Mateus Limaleft the club and signed with Kukesi. In the 2015–16 campaign, he scored seven league goals in 27 league appearances, along with three goals in the Albanian Cup.

In July 2016, Mateus Lima joined Santos, and was assigned to the B-team squad.

On the last day of the summer transfer window 2017, Mateus Lima signed with the Serbian SuperLiga side Borac Čačak.

In the summer of 2018, Mateus Lima signed a two-year contract with the Croatian First Football League side Slaven Belupo.

On 17 August 2020 he signed with Hapoel Nof HaGalil.

Career statistics

Honours
Operário Ferroviário
Campeonato Paranaense: 2015

References

External links
 
 
 

1993 births
Living people
Brazilian footballers
Association football forwards
Grêmio Barueri Futebol players
Sport Club do Recife players
Guarani FC players
Operário Ferroviário Esporte Clube players
Santos FC players
KF Skënderbeu Korçë players
FK Kukësi players
FK Borac Čačak players
NK Slaven Belupo players
Hapoel Nof HaGalil F.C. players
Hapoel Rishon LeZion F.C. players
FC Nasaf players
Campeonato Brasileiro Série B players
Kategoria Superiore players
Serbian SuperLiga players
Croatian Football League players
Liga Leumit players
Brazilian expatriate footballers
Expatriate footballers in Albania
Expatriate footballers in Serbia
Expatriate footballers in Croatia
Expatriate footballers in Israel
Expatriate footballers in Uzbekistan
Brazilian expatriate sportspeople in Albania
Brazilian expatriate sportspeople in Serbia
Brazilian expatriate sportspeople in Croatia
Brazilian expatriate sportspeople in Israel
Brazilian expatriate sportspeople in Uzbekistan